Planet's Mad is the second studio album by American DJ and producer Baauer. It was originally scheduled for release on June 3, 2020, but got pushed back to June 19, 2020 due to the COVID-19 pandemic and George Floyd protests.

Critical reception
Planet's Mad was met with generally favorable reviews from critics. At Metacritic, which assigns a weighted average rating out of 100 to reviews from mainstream publications, this release received an average score of 72, based on 5 reviews.

Track listing

References

2020 albums
Baauer albums
LuckyMe (record label) albums
Albums postponed due to the COVID-19 pandemic